Tamara Yajaira Salazar Arce (born 9 August 1997) is an Ecuadorian weightlifter. She won a silver medal at the 2020 Tokyo 87 kg Olympic competition, and both silver and bronze medals at the 2018 World Weightlifting Championships.

Career 

In the Weightlifting World Championship in 2018, Ecuadorian Tamara Salazar won silver and bronze. Salazar, raised 137 kilos (302.03 pounds) in the Clean & Jerk and won the silver medal. The Belarusian Darya Naumava raised the same, but took the gold for having less body weight. The bronze went to Lidia Valentín of Spain with 136 kg. In the total, Salazar completed 242 kg and took bronze. Valentín (249 kg) and Naumava (245 kg) took gold and silver respectively.

She won the silver medal in the women's 87 kg event at the 2020 Summer Olympics in Tokyo, Japan.

She won the gold medal in the women's 87 kg event at the 2022 Pan American Weightlifting Championships held in Bogotá, Colombia. She also won medals in the Snatch and Clean & Jerk events in this competition.

Major results

References

External links

 

1997 births
Ecuadorian female weightlifters
Living people
Medalists at the 2019 Pan American Games
Medalists at the 2020 Summer Olympics
Olympic medalists in weightlifting
Olympic silver medalists for Ecuador
Pan American Games bronze medalists for Ecuador
Pan American Games medalists in weightlifting
Pan American Weightlifting Championships medalists
Weightlifters at the 2019 Pan American Games
Weightlifters at the 2020 Summer Olympics
Olympic weightlifters of Ecuador
World Weightlifting Championships medalists
People from Carchi Province
21st-century Ecuadorian women